Sauro Catellani (born March 14, 1953, in Pegognaga) is a retired Italian professional football player.

Honours
 Anglo-Italian League Cup winner: 1976.

1953 births
Living people
Italian footballers
Serie A players
Inter Milan players
Hellas Verona F.C. players
S.S.C. Napoli players
Udinese Calcio players
L.R. Vicenza players
Parma Calcio 1913 players
Mantova 1911 players
Modena F.C. players
Association football defenders